The Men's moguls competition at the FIS Freestyle Ski and Snowboarding World Championships 2021 was held on 8 March 2021.

Qualification
The qualification was started at 12:15. The best 18 skiers qualified for the final.

Final
The final was started at 15:30.

References

Men's moguls